This is a list of elections in Canada scheduled that were held in 2021. Included are municipal, provincial and federal elections, by-elections on any level, referendums and party leadership races at any level. In bold are provincewide or federal elections (including provincewide municipal elections) and party leadership races.

January
January 9: Municipal by-election in Zeballos, British Columbia (not held due to lack of candidates)
January 15: Municipal by-election in Ward 22 Scarborough—Agincourt, Toronto
January 16: Municipal by-election in the Municipality of the District of St. Mary's, Nova Scotia
January 18: Birch Narrows Dene Nation membership code ratification vote
January 20: Municipal by-election in the Rural Municipality of Cana No. 214, Saskatchewan
January 23: 
Stikine School District election
Municipal by-election in Burns Lake and mayoral by-election in Belcarra, British Columbia
January 29: Mississaugas of Scugog Island First Nation election code vote
January 30: 
Municipal by-election in Fort St. James, British Columbia
Nipissing First Nation custom election code ratification vote

February
February 6: 
Nova Scotia Liberal Party leadership election
School District 20 Kootenay-Columbia by-election
February 10: Sumas First Nation cannabis store permit vote
February 12: Dokis First Nation Specific Claim Settlement Agreement Vote
February 13:
Municipal by-elections in the Kootenay Boundary Regional District (not held due to acclamation) and Revelstoke, British Columbia
Chilliwack School District by-election
February 17: Chief and council by-election, ʔaq̓am Community Council
February 22: 
Tl'etinqox Government election
Municipal by-elections in Resort Municipality (acclaimed), Three Rivers, Mount Stewart (council and mayoral; acclaimed), and York, Prince Edward Island (council and mayoral; acclaimed
February 23: Soda Creek Indian Band by-election
February 24: Kitsumkalum Band chief and council election
February 25: 
K'atlodeeche First Nation by-election
Muskowekwan First Nation referendum (proposed amendments to elections act)
February 26: 
Binche Whut'en by-election
Birch Narrows Dene Nation and Buffalo River Dene Nation settlement agreement votes
February 27: 
Municipal by-elections in Telkwa and Campbell River, British Columbia
Langley School District by-election
Anishinabek Nation Governance Agreement Vote

March
March 6: 
Coast Mountains School District by-election
Mayoral and council by-elections in Tofino, British Columbia
March 8: 
Municipal by-election in St. Peters Bay, Prince Edward Island (acclaimed) 
North East School Division board by-election
March 10: Skowkale First Nation election
March 11: Atikameksheng Anishnawbek lands committee election
March 12: Wabauskang First Nation general band election
March 15: Municipal by-election in Belfast and North Wiltshire, Prince Edward Island (both acclaimed)
March 22: Municipal by-election in Miminegash
March 25: 
Newfoundland and Labrador general election (postponed from February 13)
Saik‘uz First Nation council election
March 27: 
Shackan Indian Band chief and council election
Nelson, British Columbia council by-election
March 30: 
Squiala First Nation council election
Okanagan Indian Band general election
March 31: North Channel Métis Community Council general election (Métis Nation of Ontario)

April
April 6: Hupacasath First Nation election
April 10: Squamish Nation referendum
April 12: 
Yukon general election
Municipal by-elections in Central Prince, Northport and Alexandra, Prince Edward Island (mayor and councillor), all acclaimed
April 15: Esketemc First Nation council election
April 16: Mississaugas of Scugog Island First Nation Restated Land Code Community Vote
April 17: 
Conservative Party of Quebec leadership election
Masset, British Columbia council by-election
April 21: Lytton First Nation election
April 24: 
Powell River School District by-election
Castlegar, British Columbia mayoral and council by-election and Mission, British Columbia mayoral election
April 28: Frog Lake First Nation election
April 30: Gitxaala Nation election

May
May 3: 
Municipal by-elections in Kinkora, and Kensington, Prince Edward Island
Bonaparte First Nation Election
May 5: Municipal by-elections in Brandon (Ward 5) and Pinawa, Manitoba
May 8: Gitwangak Indian Band Election
May 10: 
New Brunswick municipal elections
Municipal by-elections in Borden-Carleton, Crapaud and Breadalbane, Prince Edward Island (acclaimed)
Municipal by-election in Crossfield, Alberta
May 11: Soda Creek Council Election
May 12: 
Carrot River, Saskatchewan mayoral by-election
Roblin, Manitoba municipal by-election (not held due to acclamation)
May 15: 
Municipal by-elections in Qualicum Beach and Fort St. John, British Columbia
Shawanaga First Nation General Election
May 17: Municipal by-election in Cornwall, Prince Edward Island
May 22: Takla Nation General Election
May 25: Municipal elections in Northwest New Brunswick (postponed from May 10)
May 26: Nuxalk Nation General Election
May 29: 
By-elections in North Vancouver School District and Vernon School District
Richmond, British Columbia municipal by-election

June
June 3: Municipal by-election in Ward 2, Norfolk County, Ontario
June 5: Municipal by-election in Terrace, British Columbia 
June 7: Haisla Nation Election
June 9: Municipal by-election in Snow Lake, Manitoba
June 10: Kitselas First Nation and Sq’ewlets First Nation Elections
June 16: Municipal by-election in Indian Head, Saskatchewan
June 17: Nee-Tahi-Buhn Band By-election
June 19: Municipal by-elections in Penticton and Silverton, British Columbia 
June 21: Municipal by-elections in Souris West and Sherbrooke, Prince Edward Island
June 22: Lake Babine Nation General Election
June 23: Municipal by-elections in the Municipality of Killarney-Turtle Mountain and Ste. Anne, Manitoba
June 26: 
Mohawk Council of Akwesasne general election
Central Okanagan School District by-election
Burnaby, British Columbia municipal by-election

July–September
July 7: Gitsegukla First Nation Chief and Council Election
July 9: Nipissing First Nation General Election
July 10: Municipal by-election in Pouce Coupe, British Columbia
July 17: Municipal by-election in Stewart, British Columbia
July 24: Samahquam First Nation Chief and Council Election
July 26: Tla'amin Nation by-election
July 27: Territorial by-election in Monfwi, Northwest Territories
July 31: Tobacco Plains Indian Band Council Election
August 4: Municipal by-election in Ward 3, Rural Municipality of Portage la Prairie, Manitoba
August 9: Municipal by-election in Welland, Ontario
August 10: Dzawada'enuxw First Nation General election
August 13: Prophet River First Nation Chief and Council election
August 17: 2021 Nova Scotia general election
August 30: Mayoral and councillor by-election in Victoria, Prince Edward Island
September 4: 
Zagime Anishinabek General election
Zhiibaahaasing First Nation election
September 8: Simpcw First Nation Chief and Council election
September 18: Municipal by-elections in Pouce Coupe and Creston, British Columbia
September 20: 2021 Canadian federal election
September 25: Municipal by-election in Abbotsford, British Columbia
September 26: Squamish Nation General election
September 28: Newfoundland and Labrador municipal elections

October
October 2: Hagwilget First Nation Government general election
October 4: Municipal by-elections in Warren Grove (not held due to acclamation) and Three Rivers, Prince Edward Island 
October 5: Municipal elections in Cottlesville and Summerford, Newfoundland and Labrador (delayed from September 28)
October 16: Mohawks of the Bay of Quinte Ratification vote
October 18: 
Alberta municipal elections, Alberta Senate nominee election, 2021 Alberta equalization payments referendum and 2021 Alberta daylight saving time referendum
Municipal by-election in Westport, Ontario
October 19: Northwest Territories municipal elections (taxed communities; excluding Yellowknife)
October 21: Yukon municipal elections
October 23: 
2021 Alberta Party leadership election
Little Shuswap Lake Chief Election
October 25: Nunavut general election
October 28: Mississauga First Nation by-election
October 30: 2021 Progressive Conservative Party of Manitoba leadership election

November
November 3: 
Moose Jaw, Saskatchewan mayoral by-election.
Rural Municipality of Morris, Manitoba municipal by-election
Kativik municipal elections
November 5: Binche Whut'en council by-election.
November 6: 
Colchester County, Nova Scotia District 10 council by-election.
Shxwhá:y Village council by-election in Nooksack.
Municipal by-election in Granisle, British Columbia
November 7: Quebec municipal elections
November 8: 
North Rustico, Prince Edward Island municipal by-election (candidates acclaimed)
Municipal by-elections in Beaubassin East, Cambridge-Narrows (mayor), Drummond, Kedgwick (Ward 2), Lamèque, Nigadoo, Petitcodiac, Port Elgin and Saint-Louis de Kent, New Brunswick 
November 15: Provincial by-election in Cornwall-Meadowbank, Prince Edward Island
November 17: Mayoral by-election in Birch Hills, Saskatchewan
November 23: K'atlodeeche First Nation Council election
November 25: Coldwater Indian Band General Election
November 27: Municipal by-election in Comox, British Columbia
November 29: Municipal by-election in Tignish, Prince Edward Island
November 30: 
Municipal elections in Kippens, Newfoundland and Labrador (delayed from September 28)
Skawahlook First Nation Constitution Vote
Akisqnuk First Nation Ratification Vote

December
December 3: Kwakiutl Band Council General Election
December 4: Municipal by-election in Vernon, British Columbia
December 10: Namgis First Nation Councillor election
December 13: 
Northwest Territories municipal elections (hamlets)
Municipal by-election in Division 6, Sturgeon County, Alberta and Division 5, Lethbridge County

References

External links
BC Local by-elections
2021 Municipal by-elections on PEI
Quebec municipal by-elections
Government of Canada election calendar

 
Political timelines of the 2020s by year